Bohuslav, Count Chotek von Chotkow und Wognin (4 July 182911 October 1896) was a Bohemian nobleman, landowner,  and a diplomat in the service of Austria-Hungary. He was the father of Sophie, Duchess of Hohenberg, the morganatic wife of Archduke Franz Ferdinand of Austria.

Early life
By birth member of an old Bohemian noble House of Chotek, Bohuslav was born at Prague, as the younger son of Karl, Count Chotek von Chotkow und Wognin (1783–1868) and his wife, Countess Marie Berchtold von Ungarschitz (1794–1878). Bohuslav's father was the Governor of Tyrol, Vorarlberg, and Bohemia, and also a founder of the Tyrolean State Museum.

Diplomatic career 
In 1866, Bohuslav became the Austrian ambassador in Stuttgart (Kingdom of Württemberg). In 1869, he became ambassador to St. Petersburg (Russian Empire) and from 1872 in Brussels (Belgium).

Marriage and family
Bohuslav married on 30 October 1859 in Kostelec nad Orlicí to Countess Wilhelmine Kinsky von Wchinitz und Tettau (1838–1886), elder daughter of Count Joseph Kinsky von Wchinitz und Tettau (1806–1862) and his wife, Countess Maria Czernin von und zu Chudenitz (1806–1872).

They had one son and seven daughters:
Count Wolfgang Chotek von Chotkow und Wognin (15 August 1860 – 10 December 1926), married in 1896 to Anna Elisabeth von Künell-Nedamow (1871-1922); no issue.
Countess Zdenka Chotek von Chotkow und Wognin (1861–1946)
Countess Marie Chotek von Chotkow und Wognin (11 July 1863 – 21 June 1935), married in 1887 to Jaroslav, 2nd Prince von Thun und Hohenstein (1864-1926); had issue.
Countess Caroline Chotek von Chotkow und Wognin (19 November 1865  – 29 November 1919), married in 1886 to Count Leopold von Nostitz-Rieneck (1865-1945); had issue.
Countess Sophie Chotek von Chotkow und Wognin (1 March 1868 – 28 June 1914), married morganatically in 1900 to Archduke Franz Ferdinand of Austria; had issue.
Countess Oktavia Chotek von Chotkow und Wognin (5 May 1873 – 29 November 1946), married in 1898 to Joachim, Count of Schönburg-Glauchau (1873-1943); had issue, her great-grand daughter is Gloria, Princess of Thurn and Taxis, mother of the current head of the house Albert, 12th Prince of Thurn and Taxis.
Countess Maria Antonia Chotek von Chotkow und Wognin (12 May 1874 – 13 June 1930), married in 1893 to Carl, Count von Wuthenau-Hohenthurm (1863-1946); had issue.
Countess Henriette Chotek von Chotkow und Wognin (9 July 1880 – 19 March 1964), married in 1921 to brother in law, Count Leopold von Nostitz-Rieneck (1865-1945); had issue.

Honours and awards

Ancestry

References

Notes and sources
Genealogisches Handbuch des Adels, Fürstliche Häuser, Reference: 1980 478

|-

|-

1829 births
1896 deaths
Chotek family
Nobility from Prague
Austro-Hungarian diplomats
Chamberlains of the Emperor of Austria
Diplomats from Prague
Grand Crosses of the Order of Franz Joseph
Recipients of the Order of St. Anna, 1st class
Recipients of the Order of Saint Stanislaus (Russian), 2nd class